Gagauzia has participated in the Turkvision Song Contest three times since its debut in .  The Moldovan broadcaster, Gagauz Radio Television (GRT), has been the organiser of the Gagauz entry since its debut in the contest. In 2013, Gagauzia's first entry at Turkvision, Ludmila Turkan, failed to qualify for the grand final.

History
Gagauzia made their debut in the Turkvision Song Contest at the 2013 festival, in Eskişehir, Turkey.  Lumdila Turkan was selected as the winner of the Gagauz national final, an incentive of 10,000 Moldovan leu was given to get people to participate. The song she performed in Turkey was not the same song as performed at the national final, instead she performed "Vernis Lubov".

On 20 July 2014 it was announced that Gagauzia would make their second appearance at the Turkvision Song Contest 2014 to be held in Kazan, Tatarstan in November 2014. On 17 September 2014, the Gagauz selection took place, six artists competed in the selection with the winner chosen by a jury. The winner was Mariya Topal with the song "Aaladım", it was announced that Peter Petkovic would work with Mariya on improving the song for the contest.

Participation overview

See also 
 Moldova in the Eurovision Song Contest
 Moldova in the Junior Eurovision Song Contest
 Moldova in the Turkvision Song Contest

References 

Turkvision
Moldovan music
Countries in the Turkvision Song Contest